"Skylark" is an American popular song with lyrics by Johnny Mercer and music by Hoagy Carmichael, published in 1941.

Background
Carmichael wrote the melody, based on a Bix Beiderbecke cornet improvisation, as "Bix Licks", for a project to turn the novel Young Man With a Horn into a Broadway musical. After that project failed, Carmichael brought in Johnny Mercer to write lyrics for the song. Mercer said that he struggled for a year after he got the music from Carmichael before he could get the lyrics right. Mercer recalled that Carmichael initially called him several times about the lyrics but had forgotten about the song by the time Mercer finally wrote them. The yearning expressed in the lyrics was based on Mercer's longing for Judy Garland, with whom he had an affair.

Several artists recorded charting versions of the song in 1942, including the Glenn Miller Orchestra (vocal by Ray Eberle), Harry James and His Orchestra (vocal by Helen Forrest), Dinah Shore, and Bing Crosby.

This song is considered a jazz standard. Additionally, it is believed to have inspired a long-running Buick car of the same name that was produced from 1953 to 1998.

Cover versions

References

External links
 "Johnny Mercer's Songs on CD", Ralph Mitchell, JohnnyMercer.com, June 2009, webpage: *JM-ralph: List of singers who have recorded "Skylark"
"Skylark" at Jazz Standards website

1940s jazz standards
1942 songs
Aretha Franklin songs
Bette Midler songs
Bluebird Records singles
Bobby Darin songs
Carmen McRae songs
Ella Fitzgerald songs
Glenn Miller songs
Jazz compositions in E-flat major
K.d. lang songs
Linda Ronstadt songs
Miki Howard songs
Pop standards
Sky (Canadian band) songs
Songs about birds
Songs with lyrics by Johnny Mercer
Songs with music by Hoagy Carmichael
The Fleetwoods songs